Andrew Collberg (born September 18, 1987) is a musician living in Köln, Germany who grew up in Tucson, AZ. He plays drums, guitar & bass, keyboards, and sings. He has his own song writing project called "Andrew Collberg", and he also collaborates with many other musicians, both playing live and recording in studio.

Origin
Collberg was born in Lund, Sweden and grew up in Tucson, Az.

History
In 2006, when Collberg was 18 years old, he produced his first and self-titled album, Andrew Collberg. He recorded the album on his own, playing every instrument himself. This album got Collberg much attention and local gigs. In 2008, Collberg released EPP, another album made in the same lo-fi sort of sound as his self-titled album, on which he also played all of the instruments. In 2010 On The Wreath was released on Le Pop Musik, and featured local musicians, including Calexico's Joey Burns, who plays cello on "Wait inside".  Skateboarder Ryan Decenzo used Collberg's song "Man in the Moose Suit" in his Transworld Skate video "Hallelujah".

He has played music with many acts in Tucson. He has played drums for Tucson's own Howe Gelb, Golden Boots, Naim Amor, Haboob, Orkesta Mendoza, Gabriel Sullivan, Forest Fallows. Collberg's own band has opened for acts like M. Ward and Violent Femmes. He has also contributed music for soundtracks for films such as Precious Knowledge and The Wine of Summer.

In 2011, Collberg released a 7-inch featuring two tracks, as titled, "Dirty Wind/ Back on the Shore". It was released on Ft. Lowell Records, which is a Tucson-based label. "Back on the Shore" made it to New York Daily's top 100 songs of 2012.

Albums
"MINDS HITS" August 2013 Le Pop Musik

"Dirty Wind/ Back On The Shore" 2011 Fort Lowell Records

"On The Wreath" 2010 Le Pop Musik

"EPP" 2008 MOR Sold Old

"Debut" 2006 MOR

Compilations
"Tucson Songs" 2011 Le Pop Musik

"KXCI Locals Only Volume 4" KXCI Tucson, AZ 91.3 FM

References

External links 
http://andrewcollberg.com
https://web.archive.org/web/20130425020854/http://www.lepop.de/cms/

1987 births
Living people
Musicians from Tucson, Arizona
Place of birth missing (living people)
American drummers
Swedish emigrants to the United States
Singers from Arizona
Guitarists from Arizona
American male guitarists
American male pianists
21st-century American singers
21st-century American pianists
21st-century American guitarists
21st-century American drummers
21st-century American male singers